XHPECO-FM is a radio station on 105.5 FM in Monclova, Coahuila. The station is owned by Pamela Verenice García Aguirre and known as Familiar FM with a Christian format.

History

On August 8, 2018, the Federal Telecommunications Institute adjudicated a cluster of pre-2014 applications for permit radio stations in the Monclova–Frontera area. Awarding one social frequency, the IFT granted the application of Pamela Verenice García Aguirre and denied competing bids from Fundación Multimedia, A.C., and Radio Cultural del Centro, A.C. The station signed on in the summer of 2019 with Christian programming.

References

Radio stations in Coahuila
2019 establishments in Mexico
Radio stations established in 2019
Christian radio stations in Mexico